Ed Pryor (born September 7, 1989) is an American music video director and record producer.

Early life 
At an early age he experimented with a growing interest in music production and film - influenced by his father, whom had worked as a DJ. Raised in Winchester, Tennessee a small town in southern middle Tennessee. Pryor graduation from Franklin County High School before attending and graduating from Middle Tennessee State University later moving to Nashville, Tennessee to pursue a career in the music industry.

Career

Music videos 
The award-nominated director has developed a highly coveted client list (Snoop Dogg, Kevin Gates, Dierks Bentley, Mickey Guyton) -- while also developing various content for film and television (The Late Show with Stephen Colbert, Today (American TV program), Twitch (service). He was nominated for Music Video of the Year at the 2021 CMA, CMT, and ACM awards for co-directing "Gone (Dierks Bentley song) with Wes Edwards. He was nominated for Music Duo/Group Video of the Year at the 2021 CMT Awards for Just the Way by Parmalee and Blanco Brown. His work has also been featured on noteworthy television programs and publications such as The Kelly Clarkson Show, BET Jams, Billboard (magazine), People (magazine), Rolling Stone and more.

Music production 
Pryor has produced songs for artists such as Project Pat, Bubba Sparxxx, JellyRoll, and Rittz.

His production is featured on many albums spanning several genres - rap album's such as Lil Wyte and JellyRoll's (2013) No Filter, to Average Joes Entertainment's country compilation series (2014) Mud Digger 5, to electronic inspired hip-hop on Chancellor Warhol's (2014) Paris is Burning and more. Many of these albums have appeared in the Billboard 200 and various other charts.

Pryor is also frequent collaborator with the country rap duo Redneck Souljers and has produced all four of their albums in entirety. 2015's Firewater, debuted at No. 8 on Billboard's Heatseeker's Chart, #19 on Billboard's Rap Albums Chart, #37 on Billboard's Independent Chart, and #42 on Billboard's Top Country Albums Chart.

Videos directed

Television

Film

Awards and nominations

References 

1989 births
Living people
American music video directors
Record producers from Tennessee
People from Winchester, Tennessee